Pyra is an urban-type settlement in Nizhny Novgorod Oblast, Russia, located 35 km west of Nizhny Novgorod.  Administratively, it is under the jurisdiction of the city of Dzerzhinsk.  Population:

References

Urban-type settlements in Nizhny Novgorod Oblast
Dzerzhinsk Urban Okrug